Lady June's Linguistic Leprosy is an experimental music/spoken word album by poet Lady June (a.k.a. June Campbell Cramer). It features musical contributions by Kevin Ayers and Brian Eno.

Overview
The recording was made for £400 in the living room of Kevin Ayers' Maida Vale home. The original release was of 5000 copies which quickly sold once followers of Eno and Ayers realized that they contributed to the recording. The album was later reissued by Market Square Records.

Track listing
Music by Kevin Ayers except "Optimism" by Brian Eno and "Am I?" by Kim Solomon; Lyrics by June Campbell Cramer.
Side 1
 "Some Day Silly Twenty Three" – 2:25
 "Reflections" – 1:10
 "Am I?" – 2:33
 "Everythingsnothing" – 4:25
 "Tunion" – 4:16
 "The Tourist" – 2:22
Side 2
 "Bars" – 2:46
 "The Letter" – 4:03
 "Mangel/Wurzel" – 0:58
 "To Whom It May Not Concern" – 2:52
 "Optimism" – 1:34
 "Touch Downer" – 1:59

Personnel
Lady June – vocals
Kevin Ayers – guitar, bass, vocals
Brian Eno – electronic guitar, bass, imminent, linearment, lunar lollipops, vocals
Pip Pyle – drums
Martha – vocals
David Vorhaus – kaleidophone, mix
Jakob Klasse – piano
Kim Solomon – piano on "Am I"

References and sources

External links

Credits on PlanetGong
Lady June obituary
Lady June photographs

1975 debut albums
Kevin Ayers albums
Caroline Records albums
Experimental music albums
1970s spoken word albums
Spoken word albums by English artists
Brian Eno albums